Arapahoe Municipal Airport  is a public airport located  north of the central business district of Arapahoe, a city in Furnas County, Nebraska, United States. It is owned by the Arapahoe Airport Authority.

Facilities and aircraft 
For the 12-month period ending August 2, 2005, the airport had 2,250 aircraft operations, all of which were general aviation.

References

External links 

Airports in Nebraska
Buildings and structures in Furnas County, Nebraska